Glipostenoda rosseola is a species of beetle in the genus Glipostenoda. It was described in 1876.

References

rosseola
Beetles described in 1876